Adam Tomasiak (born 15 February 1953) is a Polish rower who competed in the 1976 Summer Olympics and in the 1980 Summer Olympics.

He was born in Biesal, Gmina Gietrzwałd.

In 1976 he was a crew member of the Polish boat which finished eighth in the coxed four event.

Four years later he won the bronze medal with the Polish boat in the 1980 coxed fours competition. In the same Olympics he also competed with the Polish team in the 1980 eights contest and finished ninth.

References

External links 
 
 
 
 

1953 births
Living people
Polish male rowers
Olympic rowers of Poland
Rowers at the 1976 Summer Olympics
Rowers at the 1980 Summer Olympics
Olympic bronze medalists for Poland
Olympic medalists in rowing
People from Olsztyn County
Sportspeople from Warmian-Masurian Voivodeship
Medalists at the 1980 Summer Olympics